Alex Smith (born 2 December 1943) is a former Scottish politician who served in the European Parliament.

Smith was educated at Irvine Royal Academy and worked as a gardener and then a textile worker.  He became a shop steward with the Transport and General Workers' Union, and also became active in the Labour Party, chairing Cunninghame South Constituency Labour Party from 1983 until 1987, and also Irvine Trades Council.

At the 1989 European Parliament election, Smith was elected for South of Scotland.  He won the seat from Alasdair Hutton, the Conservative incumbent in 1989, held it against a challenge from him in 1994, but stood down as an MEP in 1999.

External links 
election results

References

1943 births
Living people
People educated at Irvine Royal Academy
Scottish Labour MEPs
MEPs for Scotland 1989–1994
MEPs for Scotland 1994–1999